John Herndon is an American musician and artist. Based in Chicago, he plays drums and percussion, and works as a producer for instrumental hip hop under the name A Grape Dope.

Career
John Herndon is a member of the bands Tortoise and Isotope 217, playing mainly drums but some other percussion (vibraphone, etc.) and occasional keyboards. He produced Deep Puddle Dynamics' song entitled "More from June" in 2002. He released the Missing Dragons EP under the alias A Grape Dope on Galaxia in 2003. It features a guest appearance from rapper Doseone.

Discography

Albums
 Backyard Bangers (2020)

EPs
 Immediate Action (2000)
 Missing Dragons (2003)

Productions
 Deep Puddle Dynamics - "More from June" from We Ain't Fessin' (Double Quotes) (2002)

Contributions
 Themselves - "You Devil You" and "Hat in the Wind" from The No Music (2002)
 Doseone - "By Horoscope Light I&II" from Ha (2005)

Remixes
 Tommy Guerrero  - "Birds Over Head (John Herndon Remix)" from Junk Collector (2001)
 Trans Am - "Cold War" from Extremixxx (2002)
 Themselves - "Dr. Moonorgun Please" from The No Music of AIFFS (2003)
 Via Tania - "On Sawyer" from Boltanski (2004)
 Via Tania - "Felt Cave" from True (2005)

References

External links
 
 
 

American hip hop record producers
Alternative rock drummers
Living people
Year of birth missing (living people)
American rock drummers
Tortoise (band) members
The For Carnation members
Five Style members
Isotope 217 members